Storbæk is a Norwegian surname. Notable people with the surname include:

 Håvard Storbæk (born 1986), Norwegian football player
 Jarl André Storbæk (born 1978), Norwegian football player

Norwegian-language surnames